Eva Nová is a 2015 Slovak drama film directed by Marko Škop. It was screened in the Discovery section of the 2015 Toronto International Film Festival where it won the FIPRESCI Prize. It was selected as the Slovak entry for the Best Foreign Language Film at the 89th Academy Awards but it was not nominated.

Cast
 Emília Vášáryová as Eva Nová
 Milan Ondrík as Ďoďo
 Anikó Varga as Helena

Awards

See also
 List of submissions to the 89th Academy Awards for Best Foreign Language Film
 List of Slovak submissions for the Academy Award for Best Foreign Language Film

References

External links
 

2015 films
2015 drama films
Slovak-language films
Sun in a Net Awards winners (films)
Slovak drama films